Stockelsdorf is a municipality in the district of Ostholstein, in Schleswig-Holstein, Germany. It is situated directly northwest of Lübeck and forms an agglomeration with the easterly town of Bad Schwartau.
The municipality contains the villages of Arfrade, Curau, Dissau, Eckhorst, Horsdorf, Klein Parin, Krumbeck, Malkendorf, Obernwohlde and Pohnsdorf.

By measure of population Stockelsdorf is the second largest municipality without town status in Schleswig-Holstein.

Partner towns
 Le Portel, Department Pas-de-Calais
 Okonek, Greater Poland Voivodeship

References

Ostholstein